The white-faced ctenotus (Ctenotus borealis)  is a species of skink found in the Northern Territory in Australia.

References

borealis
Reptiles described in 1985
Taxa named by Paul Horner (herpetologist)
Taxa named by Max King (herpetologist)